Dmytro Vasylovych Kukharchuk is a Ukrainian politician, member of the Supreme Council of the political party National Corps, political prisoner in the so-called case of Cherkasy veterans and commander of the second battalion of the Azov Special Operation Forces, Kyiv regiment.

Biography 
He was born June 4, 1990, in Vinnytsia. He graduated Cherkasy National University, received a bachelor's degree in philosophy. He later worked as a freelance journalist. At the turn of the 2000s and 2010s, he actively participated in the activities of the Ultras movement in Cherkasy.

Active participant Revolution of Dignity, took part in the storming of the Cherkasy Regional State Administration and 2014 Hrushevskoho Street riots in Kyiv.

In the spring of 2014 he became a volunteer Azov Battalion. He took part in fighting in eastern Ukraine, in particular in Battle of Marinka, Battle of Ilovaisk and Shyrokyne standoff.

Political activity 
Since 2016 he has been a member of the Supreme Council of the political party National Corps, heads the Cherkasy regional branch of the party. He worked as an assistant on a voluntary basis for the deputy Andriy Biletsky.

In January 2018, he organized the blocking of the rostrum at the session Cherkasy City Council, which 4 times in a row could not approve the budget. As a result of the blockade, there was a significant media resonance and the budget was approved.

In 2019, he ran for 9th Ukrainian Verkhovna Rada as a self-nominated candidate and member of the National Corps party in the Electoral District 194 constituency.

In March 2019, he took part in the actions of the National Corps against President Petro Poroshenko (also known as the "campaign against pig farmers"). He was the organizer and direct participant in the blockade of the presidential motorcade in Cherkasy. Kukharchuk was detained during the rally.

On September 25, 2020, the TEC was registered as a candidate for Cherkasy mayor from the National Corps party. He took the third place.

Political imprisonment
On August 14, 2021, he took part in a protest National Corps on Bankova Street, during which clashes with National Police of Ukraine took place. A criminal case (the so-called "Cherkasy Veterans Case") was opened against the most active participants in those events (including Dmytro Kukharchuk).

On August 30, 2021, Pechersk District Court of Kyiv remanded in custody (without bail) as a precautionary measure for Dmytro Kukharchuk and Oleg Dovbysh (also a veteran Azov Regiment, leader of the Cherkasy movement Ultras).

Shortly before that, Dmytro Kukharchuk publicly cut his arm veins near the Pechersk Police Department in protest of the "persecution of veterans."

The National Corps calls the detention of "Cherkasy veterans" political repression against their political force.

In September 2021, while in pre-trial detention, he became a candidate for People's Deputies in 197 constituencies in Cherkasy region.

References

1990 births
Living people
Military personnel from Vinnytsia
Politicians from Vinnytsia
Ukrainian nationalists
Ukrainian anti-communists
Ukrainian military leaders
Pro-Ukrainian people of the 2014 pro-Russian unrest in Ukraine
People of the National Guard of Ukraine
Ukrainian military personnel of the war in Donbas
Ukrainian military personnel of the 2022 Russian invasion of Ukraine